Szu Hui-fang (born 29 January 1984) is a Taiwanese volleyball player who currently plays as the libero in the Chinese Taipei women's national volleyball team.

Szu started to play volleyball at the age of 10 and had played as an attacker for years. Because of her rich experience and well performance in defense, she became the libero in 2006 FIVB Women's World Championship, in which she was ranked the best digger.

Clubs 
  Bei Chen Elementary School, Yunlin County
  Da Liao Junior High School, Kaohsiung County (now in Kaohsiung City)
  Chung Shan (2004-2005)
  National Taiwan Normal University

Awards

Individuals
 2005 Asian Club Championship "Best Setter"

National team
 World University Games
 Winner: 2005
 Runner-up: 2003

Clubs
 2005 Asian Club Championship -  Runner-Up, with Chung Shan

References

1984 births
Living people
Taiwanese women's volleyball players
People from Yunlin County
Volleyball players at the 2002 Asian Games
Asian Games medalists in volleyball
Volleyball players at the 2006 Asian Games
Medalists at the 2006 Asian Games
Asian Games bronze medalists for Chinese Taipei